The Suffragan Bishops Act 1534 (26 Hen 8 c 14) is an Act of the Parliament of England that authorised the appointment of suffragan (i.e., assistant) bishops in England and Wales. The tradition of appointing suffragans named after a town in the diocese other than the town the diocesan bishop is named after can be dated from this act.

The act named Thetford, Ipswich, Colchester, Dover, Guildford, Southampton, Taunton, Shaftesbury, Molton, Marlborough, Bedford, Leicester, Gloucester, Shrewsbury, Bristol, Penrydd, Bridgwater, Nottingham, Grantham, Hull, Huntingdon, Cambridge, Penrith, Berwick-upon-Tweed, St Germans and the Isle of Wight as specific suitable suffragan sees.

This act was partly in force in Great Britain at the end of 2010.

The repeal by the Statute Law (Repeals) Act 1969 of section 2 of the Act of Supremacy (1 Eliz 1 c 1) (1558) does not affect the continued operation, so far as unrepealed, of the Suffragan Bishops Act 1534.

Since 1898, notwithstanding anything contained in the Suffragan Bishops Act 1534 it has been lawful to nominate, present and appoint as suffragan bishop persons already consecrated as a bishop and, in that case, the letters patent presenting them do not require their consecration. The Dioceses Measure 1978 concerns petitions to make appointments under this act
 Until 1898, men already in episcopal orders were sometimes made assistant bishops instead.

Provisions

Section 2
In this section, the words from "and have such capacitie" to the end were repealed by section 15(2)(a) of the Dioceses Measure 1978. This repeal does not invalidate any commission given to a suffragan bishop which was in force immediately before the commencement of that Measure (s. 15(3)). Section 15(4) provides for such commissions to continue in force until the date on which the suffragan bishop to whom the commission was given ceases to hold that office, or the date on which the commission is revoked by the bishop of the diocese, whichever first occurs. So long as any such commission remains in force so much of section 2 of the Suffragan Bishops Act 1534 as is repealed by 15(2)(a) of that Measure continues, notwithstanding the repeal, to apply to the suffragan bishop to whom the commission was given (s. 15(5)).

Section 4
In this section, the words from "nor use" to the end were repealed by section 15(2)(b) of the Dioceses Measure 1978. This repeal does not invalidate any commission given to a suffragan bishop which was in force immediately before the commencement of that Measure (s. 15(3)). Section 15(4) provides for such commissions to continue in force until the date on which the suffragan bishop to whom the commission was given ceases to hold that office, or the date on which the commission is revoked by the bishop of the diocese, whichever first occurs. So long as any such commission remains in force so much of section 2 of the Suffragan Bishops Act 1534 as is repealed by 15(2)(b) of that Measure continues, notwithstanding the repeal, to apply to the suffragan bishop to whom the commission was given (s. 15(5)).

Section 6
In this section, the words "of the bishop to whom he shall be suffragan" were substituted for the words "where he shall have comyssyon" by section 15(6) of the Dioceses Measure 1978.

Section 7
This section was repealed by Part V of Schedule 1 to the Statute Law (Repeals) Act 1977.

1534 titles
Those titles mandated by the 1534 Act currently in use as suffragan sees today are indicated in bold type:

Other suffragan titles
Since the passage of the Suffragans Nomination Act 1888, it has been lawful to create suffragan sees named for other towns. These have so far included (those titles currently in use as suffragan sees today are indicated in bold type):

Bishop of Aston (Birmingham, 15 July 1954)
Bishop of Barking (Chelmsford; initially St Albans)
Bishop of Barrow-in-Furness (Carlisle, 6 April 1889)
Bishop of Basingstoke (Winchester)
Bishop of Beverley (York)
Bishop of Birkenhead (Chester)
Bishop of Bolton (Manchester, 8 February 1984)
Bishop of Bradford (Leeds, 20 April 2014)
Bishop of Bradwell (Chelmsford, 20 December 1967)
Bishop of Brixworth (Peterborough, 26 July 1988)
Bishop of Buckingham (Oxford, 22 November 1913)
Bishop of Burnley (Blackburn; initially Manchester)
Bishop of Coventry (Worcester; now a diocese)
Bishop of Crediton (Exeter)
Bishop of Croydon (Southwark; initially Canterbury)
Bishop of Derby (Southwell; now a diocese)
Bishop of Doncaster (Sheffield, 4 February 1972)
Bishop of Dorchester (Oxford, 2 February 1939)
Bishop of Dorking (Guildford; initially Winchester)
Bishop of Dudley (Worcester, 24 October 1973)
Bishop of Dunwich (St Edmundsbury and Ipswich, 14 August 1934)
Bishop of Ebbsfleet (Canterbury, 8 February 1994)
Bishop of Edmonton (London, 29 May 1970)
Suffragan Bishop in Europe (Europe)
Bishop of Fulham (London, 1 February 1926)
Bishop of Grimsby (Lincoln, 15 July 1935)
Bishop of Hertford (St Albans)
Bishop of Horsham (Chichester)
Bishop of Huddersfield (Leeds, 20 April 2014)
Bishop of Hulme (Manchester, 11 October 1923)
Bishop of Islington (London)
Bishop of Jarrow (Durham)
Bishop of Kensington (London)
Bishop of Kingston-upon-Thames (Southwark)

Bishop of Kirkstall (Leeds; formerly Bishop of Richmond, in Ripon diocese)
Bishop of Lancaster (Blackburn, 24 July 1936)
Bishop of Lewes (Chichester)
Bishop of Loughborough (Leicester, 12 April 2017)
Bishop of Ludlow (Hereford, 23 September 1981)
Bishop of Lynn (Norwich, 26 June 1963)
Bishop of Maidstone (Canterbury)
Bishop of Middleton (Manchester, 10 August 1926)
Bishop of Plymouth (Exeter, 21 November 1922)
Bishop of Ramsbury (Salisbury, 24 October 1973)
Bishop of Reading (Oxford)
Bishop of Repton (Derby, 18 May 1965)
Bishop of Richborough (Canterbury, 8 February 1994)
Bishop of Ripon (Leeds; formerly Bishop of Knaresborough, in Ripon diocese)
Bishop of Selby (York, 20 December 1938)
Bishop of Sheffield (York; now a diocese)
Bishop of Sherborne (Salisbury, 6 February 1925)
Bishop of Sherwood (Southwell, 18 May 1965)
Bishop of Southwark (Rochester; now a diocese)
Bishop of Stafford (Lichfield)
Bishop of Stepney (London)
Bishop of Stockport (Chester)
Bishop of Swindon (Bristol; formerly Bishop of Malmesbury, 25 July 1927)
Bishop of Tewkesbury (Gloucester)
Bishop of Tonbridge (Rochester, 11 September 1958)
Bishop of Wakefield (Leeds; formerly Bishop of Pontefract, in Wakefield diocese, 27 October 1930)
Bishop of Warrington (Liverpool)
Bishop of Warwick (Coventry, 19 December 1979)
Bishop of Whalley (Blackburn; initially Manchester, 28 June 1909)
Bishop of Whitby (York, 30 July 1923)
Bishop of Willesden (London, 8 August 1911)
Bishop of Wolverhampton (Lichfield, 6 February 1979)
Bishop of Woolwich (Southwark)

In 2015, research by the Church's Legal Office on behalf of the Dioceses Commission uncovered fourteen "forgotten" suffragan Sees which had been erected by Orders-in-Council in 1889 but never filled. The Dioceses Commission has advised that these may be revived and filled just as any other dormant See might.

By Order-in-Council dated 6 April 1889:
Bishop of Alnwick (Newcastle)
Bishop of Bishopwearmouth (Durham)
Bishop of Halifax (Leeds; formerly Wakefield)
Bishop of Hexham (Newcastle)
Bishop of Kendal (Carlisle)
Bishop of Rochdale (Manchester)
Bishop of Wigan (Liverpool)

By Order-in-Council dated 5 July 1889:
Bishop of Aylesbury (Oxford)
Bishop of Boston (Lincoln)
Bishop of Chelsea (London)
Bishop of Cirencester (Gloucester)
Bishop of Leominster (Hereford)
Bishop of Northampton (Peterborough)
Bishop of Oswestry (Lichfield)

Further — besides that of Penrydd (now in St David's diocese), erected by the 1534 Act — six further Welsh Sees were erected following the 1888 Act: at Cardiff (in Llandaff diocese), Carnarvon (Bangor), Holyhead (Bangor), Monmouth (then in Llandaff, now a diocesan See), Wrexham (St Asaph) and Swansea (then in St David's, now a diocesan See as Swansea and Brecon).

References
Halsbury's Statutes,

External links
The Suffragan Bishops Act 1534, as amended from the National Archives.

Episcopacy in Anglicanism
Acts of the Parliament of England concerning religion
Acts of the Parliament of England still in force
Acts of the Parliament of England
1534 in law
1534 in England
Christianity and law in the 16th century
1534 in Christianity